The 2014 Giro d'Italia was the 97th edition of the Giro d'Italia, one of cycling's Grand Tours. The Giro d'Italia featured 198 riders competing from 22 cycling teams, and was held from 9 May to 1 June 2014.

Teams
All eighteen UCI ProTeams were automatically invited and were obliged to attend the race. As the winners of the 2013 Coppa Italia rankings for Italian teams,  were invited to the race in October 2013. In January 2014, the three remaining wildcard places were decided by a vote on social media, from a shortlist of eight UCI Professional Continental teams.

The 22 teams that competed in the race were:

*: Pro Continental teams given wild card entry to this event.

By rider

By nationality
The 198 riders that competed in the 2014 Giro d'Italia represented 30 different countries.

References

External links

2014 Giro d'Italia
2014